Forever Now may refer to:

Albums
 Forever Now (The Psychedelic Furs album), a 1982 album
 Forever Now (Level 42 album), a 1994 album
 Forever Now, a 2003 album by Natalise

Songs
 "Forever Now" (Level 42 song)
 "Forever Now" (Cold Chisel song)
 "Forever Now" (Ne-Yo song)
 "Forever Now" (Michael Bublé song), 2019
 "Forever Now", by The Psychedelic Furs from Forever Now
 "Forever Now", by David Wilcox from Airstream
 "Forever Now", by Jon Gibson from Jesus Loves Ya
 "Forever Now", by Eloise Laws from Eloise
 "Forever Now", by Tokio Hotel from Humanoid
 "Forever Now", by Green Day from Revolution Radio